Pablo Lopez Luz (born Mexico City, 1979) is a Mexican photographer. After studying at the Universidad Iberoamericana in Mexico City, he completed a master's degree in Visual Art at NYU in 2006. Lopez Luz has participated in numerous solo and group exhibitions around the world. He has won multiple awards, including the Syngenta Photography Award and the Alt+1000 Photography Award. He has also published several books of his photographs.

References

Mexican photographers
1979 births
Living people